Adrian Rymel (born 30 October 1975 in Štramberk, Czechoslovakia) is a Czech former speedway rider.

Career
Rymel started his British speedway career when he signed for Berwick Bandits for the 2001 Premier League speedway season. He would stay with the club for ten years and eight different seasons until the end of the 2010 season. It was in 2010 that he won the Argentine Championship.

In January 2011, he retired from speedway following a crash which damaged his neck.

Speedway Grand Prix results

Honours 
 Individual World Championship (Speedway Grand Prix):
 2006 - 25th place (2 points - one wild card)
 Team World Championship (Speedway World Cup):
 1998 - 10 points in Group A
 2005 - 4th place in Race-Off (4 points)
 2006 - 4th place in Semi-Final 2 (4 points)
 ''2008 - 7th place (6 points in Event 2)
 Individual European Championship
 2008 - 8th place in Semi-Final 1 (8 points)
 European Pairs Championship:
 2006 - 4th place (13 points)
 European Club Champions' Cup:
 1998 - silver medal (7 points)
 1999 - 4th place (1 point)
 2007 - 4th place (7 points)
Argentinian Champion
 2009-2010 - 1st place (163 points)

See also 
 Czech Republic speedway team
 List of Speedway Grand Prix riders

References 

1975 births
Living people
Czech speedway riders